Vardun Point (‘Nos Vardun’ \'nos var-'dun\) is the point projecting 1 km into the head of Barilari Bay on Graham Coast in Graham Land, Antarctica, formed by an offshoot of Mitino Buttress.  The point is named after the settlement of Vardun in Northeastern Bulgaria.

Location
British mapping in 1971.

Maps
 Antarctic Digital Database (ADD). Scale 1:250000 topographic map of Antarctica. Scientific Committee on Antarctic Research (SCAR), 1993–2016.
British Antarctic Territory. Scale 1:200000 topographic map. DOS 610 Series, Sheet W 65 64. Directorate of Overseas Surveys, Tolworth, UK, 1971.

References
 Bulgarian Antarctic Gazetteer. Antarctic Place-names Commission. (details in Bulgarian, basic data in English)
 Vardun Point. SCAR Composite Antarctic Gazetteer

External links
 Vardun Point. Copernix satellite image

Headlands of Graham Land
Bulgaria and the Antarctic
Graham Coast